Ivo Hristov (Bulgarian: Иво Христов Петков, born 8 October 1970) is a Bulgarian politician who was elected as a Member of the European Parliament in 2019. In 2022, he joined the Committee of Inquiry to investigate the use of Pegasus and equivalent surveillance spyware.

References

Living people
1970 births
MEPs for Bulgaria 2019–2024
Bulgarian Socialist Party MEPs